The 1890 United States House of Representatives elections were held for the most part on November 4, 1890, with five states holding theirs early in between June and October. They occurred in the middle of President Benjamin Harrison's term. Elections were held for 332 seats of the United States House of Representatives, representing 44 states, to serve in the 52nd United States Congress. Special elections were also held throughout the year.

A stagnant economy which became worse after the Panic of 1890, combined with a lack of support for then-Representative William McKinley's (defeated in the election) steep tariff act, which favored large industries at the expense of consumers, led to a sharp defeat for Harrison's Republican Party, giving a large majority to the Democratic Party and presaging Harrison's defeat in the 1892 United States presidential election. The Republican-controlled Congress was highly criticized for its lavish spending, and it earned the unflattering nickname of The Billion Dollar Congress. Democrats promised to cut the outlandish budget.

Furthermore, aggressive Republican promotion of controversial English-only education laws enacted by Wisconsin and Illinois in 1889, accompanied by a surge in nativist and anti-Catholic sentiment within the state parties, had greatly hollowed out the party's support base in these former strongholds. A rare multi-confessional alliance of mainly German clergy rallied their flocks in defense of language and faith to the Democratic Party, which tore through incumbent Republican majorities in both states, capturing a total of 11 formerly Republican seats between them alone.  Bitterly divisive struggles over temperance laws had also been alienating immigrants from the increasingly prohibitionist Republican Party across the Midwest more broadly. Dramatic losses in the previous year's gubernatorial elections in Iowa and Ohio (which would lose another 14 Republican congressional seats between them during this election) were due in no small part to wet immigrant communities, especially Germans, expressing their resentment toward Republican efforts to ban or otherwise curtail alcohol consumption by throwing their support behind the Democratic candidates.

This election also saw the Populist Party, a coalition of farmers and laborers who wanted to overhaul the nation's financial system, make a small mark on Congress.

Special elections 

 : June 21, 1890: William W. Dickerson (D) elected to finish the term of John G. Carlisle (D), who had resigned May 26, 1890 when elected U.S. senator.  Democratic hold. Dickerson: 8,412 (63.95%), Wesley M. Rardin (R) 4,742 (36.05%).
 : December 9, 1890: Thomas J. Geary (D) elected to finish the term of John J. De Haven (R), who had resigned October 1, 1890. Democratic gain.
 
 : James P. Walker (D) died July 19, 1890, and Robert H. Whitelaw (D) was elected November 4, 1890. Democratic hold.

Election summaries

The previous election of 1888 saw the election of one Labor Party representative in Arkansas.

Early election dates
In 1890, five states, with 9 seats among them, held elections early:

June 3 Oregon
September 2 Vermont
September 8 Maine
September 11 Idaho
October 1 Wyoming

Idaho and Wyoming held elections for both the outgoing 51st Congress and the incoming 52nd Congress in 1890, having been admitted that year, and held future elections on the standard election day.

Alabama

Arkansas

California 

|-
| 
| colspan=3 | Vacant
|  | Incumbent resigned October 1, 1890.New member elected.Democratic gain.
| nowrap | 

|-
| 
| Marion Biggs
|  | Democratic
| 1886
|  | Incumbent retired.New member elected.Democratic hold.
| nowrap | 

|-
| 
| Joseph McKenna
|  | Republican
| 1884
| Incumbent re-elected.
| nowrap | 

|-
| 
| William W. Morrow
|  | Republican
| 1884
|  | Incumbent retired.New member elected.Republican hold.
| nowrap | 

|-
| 
| Thomas J. Clunie
|  | Democratic
| 1888
|  | Incumbent lost re-election.New member elected.Republican gain.
| nowrap | 

|-
| 
| William Vandever
|  | Republican
| 1886
|  | Incumbent retired.New member elected.Republican hold.
| nowrap | 

|}

Colorado 

|-
! 
| Hosea Townsend
|  | Republican
| 1888
| Incumbent re-elected.
| nowrap | 
|}

Connecticut

Delaware 

|-
! 
| John B. Penington
|  | Democratic
| 1886
|  | Incumbent retired.New member electedDemocratic hold.
| nowrap | 
|}

Florida 

|-
| 
| Robert H. M. Davidson
|  | Democratic
| 1876
|  | Incumbent lost renomination.New member elected.Democratic hold.
| nowrap | 

|-
| 
| Robert Bullock
|  | Democratic
| 1888
| Incumbent re-elected.
| nowrap | 

|}

Georgia

Idaho 

There were two elections to the new state of Idaho.

51st Congress 

|-
! 
| colspan=3 | New district
|  | New seat.New member elected.Republican gain.
| nowrap | 

|}

52nd Congress 

|-
! 
| Willis Sweet
|  | Republican 
| 1890
| Incumbent re-elected.
| nowrap | 

|}

Illinois

Indiana

Iowa

Kansas

Kentucky

Louisiana

Maine

Maryland

Massachusetts 

|-
! 
| Charles S. Randall
|  | Republican
| 1888
| Incumbent re-elected.
| nowrap | 

|-
! 
| Elijah A. Morse
|  | Republican
| 1888
| Incumbent re-elected.
| nowrap | 

|-
! 
| John F. Andrew
|  | Democratic
| 1888
| Incumbent re-elected.
| nowrap | 

|-
! 
| Joseph Henry O'Neil
|  | Democratic
| 1888
| Incumbent re-elected
| 

|-
! 
| Nathaniel P. Banks
|  | Republican
| 1888
|  |Incumbent was not re-nominated.New member elected.Democratic gain.
| nowrap | 

|-
! 
| Henry Cabot Lodge
|  | Republican
| 1886
| Incumbent re-elected.
| nowrap | 

|-
! 
| William Cogswell
|  | Republican
| 1886
| Incumbent re-elected.
| nowrap | 

|-
! 
| Frederic T. Greenhalge
|  | Republican
| 1888
|  | Incumbent lost re-election.New member elected.Democratic gain.
| nowrap | 

|-
! 
| John W. Candler
|  | Republican
| 1888
|  | Incumbent lost re-election.New member elected.Democratic gain.
| nowrap | 

|-
! 
| Joseph H. Walker
|  | Republican
| 1888
| Incumbent re-elected.
| nowrap | 

|-
! 
| Rodney Wallace
|  | Republican
| 1888
|  | Incumbent retired.New member elected.Democratic gain.
| nowrap | 

|-
! 
| Francis W. Rockwell
|  | Republican
| 1884
|  | Incumbent lost re-election.New member elected.Democratic gain.
| nowrap | 

|}

Michigan

Mississippi 

|-
! 
| John M. Allen
|  | Democratic
| 1884
| Incumbent re-elected.
| nowrap | 

|-
! 
| James B. Morgan
|  | Democratic
| 1884
|  | Incumbent retired.New member elected.Democratic hold.
| nowrap | 

|-
! 
| Thomas C. Catchings
|  | Democratic
| 1884
| Incumbent re-elected.
| nowrap | 

|-
! 
| Clarke Lewis
|  | Democratic
| 1888
| Incumbent re-elected.
| nowrap | 

|-
! 
| Chapman L. Anderson
|  | Democratic
| 1886
|  | Incumbent lost renomination.New member elected.Democratic hold.
| nowrap | 

|-
! 
| T. R. Stockdale
|  | Democratic
| 1886
| Incumbent re-elected.
| nowrap | 

|-
! 
| Charles E. Hooker
|  | Democratic
| 1886
| Incumbent re-elected.
| nowrap | 

|}

Missouri

Montana 

|-
! 
| Thomas H. Carter
|  | Republican 
| 1889
|  | Incumbent lost re-election.New member elected.Democratic gain.
| nowrap | 

|}

Nebraska 

|-
! 
| William J. Connell
|  | Republican
| 1888
|  | Incumbent lost re-election.New member elected.Democratic gain.
| nowrap | 

|-
! 
| Gilbert L. Laws
|  | Republican 
| 1889 (special)
|  | Incumbent retired.New member elected.Populist gain.
| nowrap | 

|-
! 
| George W. E. Dorsey
|  | Republican 
| 1884
|  | Incumbent lost re-election.New member elected.Populist gain.
| nowrap | 

|}

Nevada

New Hampshire

New Jersey

New York

North Carolina

North Dakota 

|-
! 
| Henry C. Hansbrough
|  | Republican
| 1889
|  | Incumbent lost renomination.New member elected.Republican hold.
| nowrap | 

|}

Ohio 

The Ohio Legislature redistricted the state between censuses. Coupled with other Democratic gains, this redistricting gave the Democrats a nine-seat net gain.

|-
| 
| Benjamin Butterworth
|  | Republican
| 1884
|  | Incumbent retired.New member elected.Republican hold.
| nowrap | 

|-
| 
| John A. Caldwell
|  | Republican
| 1888
| Incumbent re-elected.
| nowrap | 

|-
| rowspan=2 | 
| Elihu S. Williams
|  | Republican
| 1886
|  | Incumbent retired.Republican loss.
| rowspan=2 nowrap | 
|-
| Henry Lee MoreyRedistricted from the 7th district
|  | Republican
| 1888
|  | Incumbent lost re-election.New member elected.Democratic gain.

|-
| 
| Samuel S. Yoder
|  | Democratic
| 1886
|  | Incumbent retired.New member elected.Democratic hold.
| nowrap | 

|-
| 
| George E. Seney
|  | Democratic
| 1886
|  | Incumbent retired.New member elected.Democratic hold.
| nowrap | 

|-
| 
| Melvin M. Boothman
|  | Republican
| 1886
|  | Incumbent retired.New member elected.Democratic gain.
| nowrap | 

|-
| 
| William E. HaynesRedistricted from the 10th district
|  | Democratic
| 1888
| Incumbent re-elected.
| nowrap | 

|-
| 
| Robert P. Kennedy
|  | Republican
| 1886
|  | Incumbent retired.New member elected.Democratic gain.
| nowrap | 

|-
| rowspan=2 | 
| William C. Cooper
|  | Republican
| 1884
|  | Incumbent retired.New member elected.Republican loss.
| rowspan=2 nowrap | 
|-
| Joseph H. OuthwaiteRedistricted from the 13th district
|  | Democratic
| 1884
| Incumbent re-elected.

|-
| 
| colspan=3 | Open seat
|  | New seat.New member elected.Republican gain.
| nowrap | 

|-
| 
| Albert C. Thompson
|  | Republican
| 1886
|  | Lost renomination.New member elected.Democratic gain.
| nowrap | 

|-
| 
| Jacob J. Pugsley
|  | Republican
| 1886
|  | Incumbent retired.New member elected.Republican hold.
| nowrap | 

|-
| 
| colspan=3 | Open seat
|  | New seat.New member elected.Democratic gain.
| nowrap | 
|-
| rowspan=2 | 
| Charles Preston Wickham
|  | Republican
| 1886
|  | Incumbent retired.Republican loss.
| rowspan=2 nowrap | 

|-
| James W. OwensRedistricted from the 16th district
|  | Democratic
| 1888
| Incumbent re-elected.

|-
| 
| Charles H. Grosvenor
|  | Republican
| 1886
|  | Lost renomination.New member elected.Democratic gain.
| nowrap | 

|-
| 
| William McKinleyRedistricted from the 18th district
|  | Republican
| 1886
|  | Incumbent lost re-election.New member elected.Democratic gain.
| nowrap | 

|-
| 
| colspan=3 | Open seat
|  | New seat.New member elected.Democratic gain.
| nowrap | 

|-
| 
| Joseph D. TaylorRedistricted from the 17th district
|  | Republican
| 1886
| Incumbent re-elected.
| nowrap | 

|-
| 
| Ezra B. Taylor
|  | Republican
| 1880
| Incumbent re-elected.
| nowrap | 

|-
| 
| Martin L. Smyser
|  | Republican
| 1888
|  | Lost renomination.New member elected.Republican hold.
| nowrap | 

|-
| 
| Theodore E. Burton
|  | Republican
| 1888
|  | Incumbent lost re-election.New member elected.Democratic gain.
| nowrap | 

|}

Oregon

Pennsylvania

Rhode Island

South Carolina 

|-
| 
| Samuel Dibble
|  | Democratic
| 1882
|  | Incumbent retired.New member elected.Democratic hold.
| nowrap | 

|-
| 
| George D. Tillman
|  | Democratic
| 1878
| Incumbent re-elected.
| nowrap | 

|-
| 
| James S. Cothran
|  | Democratic
| 1886
|  | Incumbent retired.New member elected.Democratic hold.
| nowrap | 

|-
| 
| William H. Perry
|  | Democratic
| 1884
|  | Incumbent retired.New member elected.Democratic hold.
| nowrap | 

|-
| 
| John J. Hemphill
|  | Democratic
| 1882
| Incumbent re-elected.
| nowrap | 

|-
| 
| George W. Dargan
|  | Democratic
| 1882
|  | Incumbent retired.New member elected.Democratic hold.
| nowrap | 

|-
| 
| Thomas E. Miller
|  | Republican
| 1888
|  | Incumbent lost re-election.New member elected.Democratic gain.
| nowrap | 

|}

South Dakota 

|-
! rowspan=2 | 
| John Pickler
|  | Republican
| nowrap | 1889
| Incumbent re-elected.
| nowrap rowspan=2 | 

|-
| Oscar S. Gifford
|  | Republican
| nowrap | 1889
|  | Incumbent lost renomination.New member elected.Republican hold.

|}

Tennessee 

|-
! 
| Alfred A. Taylor
|  | Republican
| 1888
| Incumbent re-elected.
| nowrap | 

|-
! 
| Leonidas C. Houk
|  | Republican
| 1878
| Incumbent re-elected.
| nowrap | 

|-
! 
| Henry C. Evans
|  | Republican
| 1888
|  |Incumbent lost re-election.New member elected.Democratic gain.
| nowrap | 

|-
! 
| Benton McMillin
|  | Democratic
| 1878
| Incumbent re-elected.
|  nowrap | 

|-
! 
| James D. Richardson
|  | Democratic
| 1884
| Incumbent re-elected.
| nowrap | 

|-
! 
| Joseph E. Washington
|  | Democratic
| 1886
| Incumbent re-elected.
| nowrap | 

|-
! 
| Washington C. Whitthorne
|  | Democratic
| 1886
|  |Incumbent retired.New member elected.Democratic hold.
| nowrap | 

|-
! 
| Benjamin A. Enloe
|  | Democratic
| 1886
| Incumbent re-elected.
| nowrap | 

|-
! 
| Rice A. Pierce
|  | Democratic
| 1888
| Incumbent re-elected.
| nowrap | 

|-
! 
| James Phelan Jr.
|  | Democratic
| 1886
|  |Incumbent retired.New member elected.Democratic hold.
| 

|}

Texas

Utah 

See Non-voting delegates below.

Vermont 

|-
! 
| John W. Stewart
|  | Republican
| 1882
|  | Incumbent retired.New member elected.Democratic hold.
| nowrap | 

|-
! 
| William W. Grout
|  | Republican
| 1884
| Incumbent re-elected.
| nowrap | 
|}

Virginia 

|-
! 
| Thomas H. B. Browne
|  | Republican
| 1886
|  | Incumbent lost re-election.New member elected.Democratic gain.
| nowrap | 

|-
! 
| George E. Bowden
|  | Republican
| 1886
|  | Incumbent lost re-election.New member elected.Democratic gain.
| nowrap | 

|-
! 
| Edmund Waddill Jr.
|  | Republican
| 1888
|  | Incumbent retired.New member elected.Democratic gain.
| nowrap | 

|-
! 
| John M. Langston
|  | Republican
| 1888
|  | Incumbent lost re-election.New member elected.Democratic gain.
| nowrap | 

|-
! 
| Posey G. Lester
|  | Democratic
| 1888
| Incumbent re-elected.
| nowrap | 

|-
! 
| Paul C. Edmunds
|  | Democratic
| 1886
| Incumbent re-elected.
| nowrap | 

|-
! 
| Charles T. O'Ferrall
|  | Democratic
| 1884
| Incumbent re-elected
| nowrap | 

|-
! 
| William H. F. Lee
|  | Democratic
| 1886
| Incumbent re-elected.
| nowrap | 

|-
! 
| John A. Buchanan
|  | Democratic
| 1888
| Incumbent re-elected.
| nowrap | 

|-
! 
| Henry St. George Tucker
|  | Democratic
| 1888
| Incumbent re-elected
| nowrap | 

|}

Washington 

|-
! 
| John L. Wilson
|  | Republican
| 1888
| Incumbent re-elected.
| nowrap | 
|}

West Virginia 

|-
! 
| George W. Atkinson
|  | Republican
| 1888
|  | Incumbent retired.New member elected.Democratic gain.
| nowrap | 

|-
! 
| William L. Wilson
|  | Democratic
| 1882
| Incumbent re-elected.
| nowrap | 

|-
! 
| John D. Alderson
|  | Democratic
| 1888
| Incumbent re-elected.
| nowrap | 

|-
! 
| Charles B. Smith
|  | Republican
| 1888
|  | Incumbent lost re-election.New member elected.Democratic gain.
| nowrap | 

|}

Wisconsin 

Wisconsin elected nine members of congress on Election Day, November 4, 1890.

|-
! 
| Lucien B. Caswell
|  | Republican
| 1884
| |  Incumbent lost re-nomination.New member elected.Democratic gain.
| nowrap | 

|-
! 
|Charles Barwig
|  | Democratic
| 1888
| Incumbent re-elected.
| nowrap | 

|-
! 
| Robert M. La Follette
|  | Republican
| 1884
| |  Incumbent lost re-election.New member elected.Democratic gain.
| nowrap | 

|-
! 
| Isaac W. Van Schaick
|  | Republican
| 1888
| |  Incumbent declined re-nomination.New member elected.Democratic gain.
| nowrap | 

|-
! 
| George H. Brickner
|  | Democratic
| 1888
| Incumbent re-elected.
| nowrap | 

|-
! 
| Charles B. Clark
|  | Republican
| 1886
| |  Incumbent lost re-election.New member elected.Democratic gain.
| nowrap | 

|-
! 
| Ormsby B. Thomas
|  | Republican
| 1884
| |  Incumbent lost re-election.New member elected.Democratic gain.
| nowrap | 

|-
! 
| Nils P. Haugen
|  | Republican
| 1887
| Incumbent re-elected.
| nowrap | 

|-
! 
| Myron H. McCord
|  | Republican
| 1888
| |  Incumbent lost re-election.New member elected.Democratic gain.
| nowrap | 

|}

Wyoming 

Republican Clarence D. Clark was elected over Democrat George T. Beck in a single ballot both to finish the current term (ending 1891) and the next term (beginning 1891).

|-
! 
| colspan=3 | Vacant (new seat)
|  | New member elected.Republican gain.
| nowrap | 

|}

Non-voting delegates

51st Congress 

|-
! 
| colspan=3 | New seat
|  | New seat.New delegate elected to finish the current term.Republican gain.
| nowrap | 

|}

52nd Congress 

|-
! 

|-
! 

|-
! 
| colspan=3 | New seat
|  | New seat.New delegate elected to the next term.Republican gain.
| nowrap | 

|-
! 
| John T. Caine
|  | Populist
| 1882
| Incumbent re-elected
| nowrap | 

|}

See also
 1890 United States elections
 1890–91 United States Senate elections
 51st United States Congress
 52nd United States Congress

Notes

References

Bibliography

External links
 Office of the Historian (Office of Art & Archives, Office of the Clerk, U.S. House of Representatives)